Legacy: The Best Of Mansun (released 18 September 2006) is the first official 'best of' collection from Mansun. It collects all the bands Parlophone lead-EP tracks and selected album tracks which were compiled by Paul Draper and Dominic Chad. It was released as a standard CD, special edition CD and DVD set featuring all the bands promo videos and digital download. In Japan the compilation included two bonus tracks.

Contents
There is an unreleased track "South of the Painted Hall" that you can download for free when you sign up on their mailing list and insert the CD into your computer. The track was recorded in 2001 for the band's fourth album. When the band split, all unreleased recordings were to be released as a compilation; Kleptomania. Unfortunately, the vocal track for "South of the Painted Hall" was lost and so the track was not included. During the compilation of Legacy, a demo CD was found in the archives containing a rough mix of the track, complete with vocals. It is this version that is available for download.

As Mansun's albums were concept albums, each a continuous piece of music, many of the band's singles had to be re-edited or even re-recorded, especially those from their second album Six. The single version of Being a Girl, for example, was just the first two minutes of section of a track which, on the album, lasted over seven.

The special edition included a DVD that featured all of the bands promo videos, a live performance of "Taxloss", a montage of video footage set to "Love Remains" and Nobody Cares When You're Gone a twenty-minute documentary produced for the compilation. The documentary was cut from the band's own personal footage and narrated by Paul Draper and Dominic Chad, who have given a new rare audio interview especially for the documentary (their first together since the end of the band).

Track listing

Personnel
Mansun were
 Paul Draper
 Dominic Chad
 Stove King
 Andie Rathbone

Early band members
Carlton Hibbert (1995–1996)
Mark Swinnerton (1995–1996)
Julian Fenton (1996)

CD track listing credits
Paul Draper - producer (2, 3, 4, 5, 6, 7, 8, 9, 11, 13, 14, 15, 17), strings arrangement (9), mixing (15)
Hugh Padgham - producer (1, 12, 16)
Mark 'Spike' Stent - producer (4, 5, 7), mixing (1, 2, 5, 6, 7, 8, 9, 12, 16, 17), additional production (8), strings recording (9)
Arthur Baker - producer (10), mixing (10)
Richard Rainey - producer (11, 15)
Mike Hunter - co-producer (1, 12, 16), engineer (2, 5, 7, 8, 9, 19), assistant engineer (3, 6, 14), recording (4, 13, 17)
Ian Caple - engineer (2, 3), recording (13, 17)
Ronnie Stone - engineer (3, 6, 8, 14), recording (13), mixing (14)
Cenzo Townshend - engineer (11, 15), mixing (11)
Clif Norrell - mixing (3, 13)
Nick Griffiths - mixing (18)
Ian Grimble - mixing (19)
Dominic Chad - harpsichord (9)
Stephen Hussey - strings arrangement (9)

DVD credits
Jonathan Walton - editing (Nobody Cares When You're Gone)
Steve Lamacq - Audio interviewer (Nobody Cares When You're Gone)
Jai Stokes - editing ("Taxloss (Live at Brixton Academy – 23/10/98)")
Hollo - filmed on the road footage, 1997 ("Love Remains (Super 8 montage)")
Grant Gee - filmed on-stage footage, 1998 ("Love Remains (Super 8 montage)")

Compilation credits
Christian Wright - mastering (at Abbey Road Studios)
Paul Draper, Dominic Chad - compilers
Matt Davey - project co-ordination
Pennie Smith - booklet photography
Tom Sheehan, Neil Mersh, Yosuke Komatsu, Ian Tilson, Satako Owada (Positive Insanity), Amanda Smith - Front sleeve montage
Traffic - Design

Chart positions

References

External links

Legacy: The Best Of Mansun at YouTube (streamed copy where licensed)

2006 greatest hits albums
Mansun albums
Albums produced by Hugh Padgham
2006 video albums
Music video compilation albums